The 1976 President Park's Cup Football Tournament was the sixth competition of Korea Cup. It was held from 11 to 22 May 1976, and the opening ceremony was held at the Dongdaemun Stadium.

Group stage

Group A

Group B

Knockout stage

Bracket

Semi-finals

Third place play-off

Final

See also
Korea Cup
South Korea national football team results

External links
President Park's Cup 1976 (South Korea) at RSSSF

1976